The 2011 FIA GT3 European Championship season was the sixth season of the FIA GT3 European Championship. The season commenced on May 8 at Algarve and ended on October 16 at Zandvoort. The season featured six double-header rounds, with each race lasting for a duration of 60 minutes. Most of the events were support races to the 2011 FIA GT1 World Championship season.

Calendar
On December 10, 2010, the FIA World Motor Sport Council announced the 2010 calendar in co-ordinance with the FIA GT1 World Championship. On 30 May 2011, the round in Smolensk was dropped from the schedule. On 21 July, a replacement round at the Slovakiaring was announced.

Entries
2011 sees a new manufacturer in the series with Mercedes-Benz joining the GT3 grid with their SLS-AMG sports cars. Ferrari have replaced the F430 with the brand new 458 Italia. The F430 is still eligible to race in this year's season, as is the Chevrolet Corvette Z06.R and BMW Alpina B6 GT3 that competed last year. The only car switch from a team has come from Graff Racing who have switched from racing a Corvette last year to the new Mercedes-Benz SLS. There are also a few new teams on the entry list from round one mostly from the new cars that Ferrari and Mercedes-Benz have produced.

Results and standings

Race results

Championships
Championship points will be awarded to the first ten positions in each race. Entries must complete 75% of the winning car's race distance in order to be classified and earn points. Individual drivers are required to participate for a minimum of 25 minutes in order to earn championship points in any race.

Drivers' Championship

Teams' Championship

References

External links
 Official Website of the FIA GT3 European Championship

FIA GT3
FIA GT3
FIA GT3 European Championship